The 2015 CAA Men's Soccer Tournament was the 33rd edition of the tournament. It determined the Colonial Athletic Association's automatic berth into the 2015 NCAA Division I Men's Soccer Championship.

The Hofstra Pride won the tournament, besting the Delaware Fightin' Blue Hens in the championship match.

Qualification 

The top six teams in the Colonial Athletic Association based on their conference regular season records qualified for the tournament.

Bracket

Schedule

Quarterfinals

Semifinals

Championship

Statistical leaders

Top goalscorers

Tournament Best XI

See also 
 Colonial Athletic Association
 2015 Colonial Athletic Association men's soccer season
 2015 NCAA Division I men's soccer season
 2015 NCAA Division I Men's Soccer Championship

References 

tournament 2015
Colonial Athletic Association Men's Soccer
Colonial Athletic Association Men's Soccer
Colonial Athletic Association Men's Soccer